Matthew "Matt" Trouville (born 6 September 1986 in Darlinghurst, New South Wales) is an Australian-American former rugby union player who played flanker for the Houston SaberCats in Major League Rugby (MLR) and also for the United States Eagles rugby team.

Trouville made his debut for the United States in 2014 and was part of the squad at the 2015 Rugby World Cup.

Trouville retired in 2019 to start as a Customer Success Consultant at Logic20/20.

References

External links
 

Living people
1986 births
United States international rugby union players
Houston SaberCats coaches
Houston SaberCats players
American rugby union players
Rugby union flankers